Schizanthus pinnatus, called butterfly flower or poor man's orchid, names it shares with other members of its genus, is a species of plant in the genus Schizanthus in the nightshade family, Solanaceae, native to Chile and naturalized elsewhere. It has gained the Royal Horticultural Society's Award of Garden Merit as an ornamental.

Description 

It is an annual plant of 20 to 50 cm in height, glandulous]]-pubescent, with pinnatisect leaves 2.5 to 3 cm in length, divided into 6 to 8 pairs in oblong-linear segments, entire or separated. The flowers are white, pink or violet, 2 to 3 cm in diameter, arranged in paniculate inflorescences, sometimes dichotomous. The fruit is a globular boll of approximately 5 mm length. It is commonly known as the "small butterfly" ("mariposita") or "small, white butterfly" ("mariposita blanca").

References

Solanaceae
Endemic flora of Chile
Garden plants of South America
Plants described in 1798